Gestamp Automoción, S.A. simply known as Gestamp, is a Spanish multinational automotive engineering company. It is one of leading firms in the European automotive industry.

History
Corporación Gestamp, Spain's largest automotive supplier steel company was founded in 1997, as a spin-off of Gonvarri, created in 1958; it is wholly owned by the Riberas family.

When Gestamp Automoción was formed, it exclusively supplied SEAT. It had begun from Gonvauto in 1991.

On 29 April 2011 Gestamp Automoción bought ThyssenKrupp Metal Forming (TKMF), formerly owned by ThyssenKrupp, the large German international company. The ThyssenKrupp division employed around 5,700 people.

Structure
It is based in Madrid in the Alfonso XII street just in front of the Retiro´s park.

It has over 100 production plants in 21 countries -
 45 in western Europe
 17 in eastern Europe
 13 in North America
 13 in South America
 17 in Asia

It has 13 R&D centres.

Products
 Structural components of automobiles (crossmembers)

See also
 Automotive industry in Spain

References

External links
 Gestamp Automoción
 Gestamp UK
 Corporación Gestamp

Video clips
 Inside of Spanish factory in 2011

1997 establishments in Spain
Auto parts suppliers of Spain
Biscay
Manufacturing companies established in 1997
Engineering companies of Spain
Manufacturing companies based in Madrid
Spanish brands